The Sabato (Fiume Sabato) is a river in southern Italy. It is a tributary of the Calore Irpino (Calore Beneventano) and joins it at Benevento.

Notes

Further reading
 

Rivers of Italy
Rivers of the Province of Benevento